Dmitri Viktorovich Zhivoglyadov (born 29 May 1994) is a Russian professional footballer who plays as a right-back for Lokomotiv Moscow.

Club career
He made his professional debut on 8 August 2015 for FC Dynamo Moscow in a Russian Football Premier League game against FC Anzhi Makhachkala.

On 11 June 2019, he signed a 4-year contract with FC Lokomotiv Moscow.

International career
On 8 November 2020, he was called up to the Russia national football team for the first time for the games against Moldova, Turkey and Serbia.

Career statistics

Club

Honours

Club
Lokomotiv Moscow
Russian Cup: 2020–21
Russian Super Cup: 2019

References

External links
 

1994 births
People from Dubna
Sportspeople from Moscow Oblast
Living people
Russian footballers
Russia youth international footballers
Russia under-21 international footballers
Association football defenders
FC Dynamo Moscow players
FC Ufa players
FC Lokomotiv Moscow players
Russian Premier League players